Big Woods refers to a type of temperate hardwood forest ecoregion found in western Wisconsin and south-central Minnesota. "Big Woods" is a direct translation of the name given to the region by French explorers: .

Trees and native vegetation
The dominant trees are American elm, basswood, sugar maple, and red oak. The understory is composed of  ironwood, green ash, and aspen. Today most of this region has been cleared for agriculture and urban development. Remnant and secondary stands of Big Woods remain in parks and other protected areas. Native vegetation based on soils information (note the bright green color) from the Natural Resources Conservation Service of the United States Department of Agriculture shows the historic extent of oak savannas in the Big Woods region (See accompanying pie chart, below).

Ecology
The soil of the Big Woods is thick glacial till of crushed limestone, deposited by the Des Moines lobe of the Wisconsin glaciation 10,000 years ago. The landscape is characterized by round hills and numerous undrained lakes left by melting ice blocks.  These hills and lakes suppressed fires that were instrumental forces on the prairie to the west and the oak savanna to the south and east.  The Minnesota and Crow Rivers flow through the region, but many of the 100 or so lakes had no inlets or outlets.

Preservation
A fragment of the Big Woods in mostly pristine condition is preserved in Nerstrand-Big Woods State Park near Nerstrand, Minnesota.

In culture
Little House in the Big Woods by American author Laura Ingalls Wilder takes place near her home town of Pepin, Wisconsin.

References

Ecoregions of Minnesota
Forests of Minnesota
Forests of Wisconsin
Temperate broadleaf and mixed forests in the United States